The 2004 1000 km of Silverstone was the third round of the 2004 Le Mans Series season, held at the Silverstone Circuit, United Kingdom.  It was run on August 13, 2004.

Official results

Class winners in bold.  Cars failing to complete 70% of winner's distance marked as Not Classified (NC).

† - #74 RSR Racing was not allowed to qualify due to failing technical scrutineering.

Statistics
 Pole Position - #22 Zytek Engineering - 1:34.033
 Fastest Lap - #22 Zytek Engineering - 1:36.932
 Average Speed - 180.263 km/h

External links
 World Sports Racing Prototypes - 2004 1000 km of Silverstone results

S
6 Hours of Silverstone
Silverstone 1000